Metronome was a music magazine published from January 1885 to December 1961.

History

Founding (1885) 
Bandmaster Arthur Albert Clappé (1850–1920) first published The Metronome in January 1885 for band leaders.{{Sfn|Jacobs' Band Monthly, July|1919|p=10}} In 1891, Harry Coleman (1845–1895), a Philadelphia music publisher and publisher of a monthly music magazine The Dominant, invited Clappé to become its editor. He accepted, and Carl Fischer (1849–1923) took over The Metronome as publisher until 1914. Violinist Gustav Saenger (1865–1935) succeeded Clappé in 1904 as editor and also continued as editor of the Musical Observer – also published by Fischer. Saenger continued as Metronome's editor until 1928.

 Shift towards popular music and jazz (1920s) Metronome began to shift away from classical music in the 1920s, when it featured a "Saxophone Department," an instrument family that, by then, had become a symbol of American popular music. In 1932 – Doron Kemp Antrim (1889–1961), editor from 1928 through 1939 – the magazine's tagline read "For Orchestra, Band, Radio and Motion Picture Theatre Musicians.

Edgar Bitner (né Edgar Franklin Bitner; 1877–1939), who headed Leo Feist, Inc., after its founder's death, was, according to author Russell Sanjek, a Tin Pan Alley pioneer, who, with Julius P. Witmark and Nathan Burkan (1878–1936) (a founding father of intellectual property law), was one of ASCAP's honorary pioneer members.  As a sideline, after retiring from Feist in 1936, Bitner took over publishing of Metronome and the Musical Courier, both of which his son, Edgar, Jr. (1912–1966), took over after his death.

Beginning with the swing era, Metronome focused primarily on the genre of Jazz music appealing to fans. Writers for the magazine were its co-editors, Leonard Feather and Barry Ulanov; Miles Davis cited them as the only two white music critics in New York to understand bebop.

George T. Simon, editor-in-chief from 1939 through 1955, sometimes wrote articles under the pseudonym Jimmy Bracken. He was a drummer. He changed the magazine's focus from articles on instrument-making and publishing to items about recordings and the noted big-band leaders of the day.

Bill Coss (né William Hungerford Coss, Jr.; 1925–1988), editor-in-chief from 1956 through 1960 – had earned a bachelor of science degree from Boston College in 1951. He was editor-in-chief of Jazz Today. The demise of Metronome (1959–1961) Metronome, under financial duress, was set to close after the December 1959 issue, but, in the words of author John Gennari, they "won a reprieve when photography editor Herb Snitzer prevailed upon his wife's uncle, Robert Asen, buy the defunct  publication. Resuming operation under the leadership of Snitzer, editor Dave Solomon, and art director Jerry Smokler [né Herbert Jerold Smokler; born 1935], Metronome became, briefly, a hip, avant-garde publication that surrounded its jazz coverage with cutting-edge Beat literature,  "politically-charged cartoons, and other innovative visual material."

Asen was Metronome's publisher and Milton Lichtenstein was president of the underlying publishing firm, Metronome Corporation, a wholly-owned subsidiary of RMC Associates in New York founded in 1953 by Robert Hyman Asen (1910–1993), Milt Lichtenstein (né Milton Julian Lichtenstein; 1919–2005), and Charlie Sargent (né Charles Edmund Sargeant; 1903–1967). Saving Metronome was not RMC's primary mission. The primary mission of RMC's personnel was to serve as manufacturers' representatives and field engineers in (what some referred to as) the most concentrated territory in the world for electronic instrumentation and engineering component markets. RMC's clients included Hewlett-Packard, Western Electric, Bell Telephone Labs, Sperry Gyroscope, and Grumman Aircraft Engineering – and also unique clients such as the United Nations, Les Paul, and Mary Ford.

Asen, in December 1960, hired new managing editor David Solomon (1925–2007), who had been an editor at Esquire and Playboy in the 1950s.

"Trouble came in July 1961 when a cover photograph of a Coney Island female stripper [and an accompanying article by Snitzer with more provocative photos] raised the ire of high school librarians, five or six-hundred of whom cancelled their subscriptions. Solomon was fired, Dan Morgenstern took over, and the magazine reverted to straight jazz coverage."

The final issue of Metronome was printed in December 1961 (Volume 78, No. 12).

Metronome All-Stars BandMetronome magazine conducted an annual poll during the years 1939-1961 to choose the musicians whom their readers considered as the top jazz instrumentalists, for that year, playing each instrument. Often, the Metronome organization recorded the all-stars on a regular basis, with recording sessions of the bands chosen in 1939-1942, 1945–1950, 1953, and 1956.

In many cases, the all-stars group recorded two songs, with short solo performances, from nearly all of the participants.

In 1940, Metronome magazine organized the Metronome All Star Nine, including Harry James, Jack Teagarden, Benny Carter, Jess Stacy, Charlie Christian and Gene Krupa.

The all-stars band had several name variations: Metronome All Star Nine; Metronome All Stars; Metronome All Stars 1956; The Metronome All-Stars; or Metronome Allstars.

Metronome Hall of Fame series
The following artists were inducted into Metronomes Hall of Fame series. According to jazz musician and Metronome contributor George T. Simon, the series "was designed to recognize sidemen, not leaders", but "quite a number of these sidemen eventually wound up as leaders".

 Earlier publication by the same name  
An earlier publication, The Metronome: A Monthly Review of Music'', was published in Boston by White & Goullaud from April 1871 to May 1874 → Ambrose W. Davenport, Jr. (1838–1906), Editor, assisted by his brother, Warren Davenport (1840–1908). ; .

See also
Metronome All-Stars

Bibliography

Annotations

Notes

References

 
 

  .
 

  ; ; .

  

 

 {{cite journal |ref=Frank R. Seltzer was Cornetist with John Philip Sousa's bank on its initial tour in 1892, with the Philadelphia Orchestra for four seasons, and toured with Conway's band.

  .

  , .

 
   Note: Sanjek was a longtime executive at BMI and is the father of music educator David Sanjek

  ; .

 
  ; .

  ;  (publication);  (article).
  ; ;  (reprint by Greenwood Press).

External links
 

 
 
 

 
 
 

 
 
 

 
<li> 

 
 
 
 
 

 
 
 

 
 
 

 
 

 
 Metronome Orchestra Monthly (1915: Vol. 31, nos. 1–10).
 Metronome Band Monthly (1917: Vol. 33, nos. 1–12).

Music magazines published in the United States
Magazines established in 1885
Magazines disestablished in 1961
Defunct magazines published in the United States
1885 establishments in the United States